Mogoșoaia is a commune in the west of Ilfov County, Muntenia, Romania, composed of a single village, Mogoșoaia. 

In late 17th century, Constantin Brâncoveanu bought land here, and, between 1698 and 1702, he built the Mogoșoaia Palace.

Natives
 Raul Costin

References

Communes in Ilfov County
Localities in Muntenia